Joanna Marie "Pinky" Pagaspas Webb (born June 11, 1970) is a Filipina broadcast journalist currently working for CNN Philippines. She is the daughter of Freddie Webb and a sister of Jason and Hubert Webb.

Education
She attended high school at Colegio San Agustin where she was classmates with Kris Aquino. She studied at De La Salle University where she initially took AB Psychology then decided to shift to AB Management. She also took up a few courses at UCLA and Cal State Long Beach on journalism for a semester.

Career
During her career at ABS-CBN, Webb was a first news anchor of ANC Primetime News (1999–2004) and Dateline Philippines (2004–2014) and also host of Umagang Kay Ganda, XXX: Exklusibong, Explosibong, Exposé (from 2008 until the show ended) and TV Patrol Weekend. She was a radio co-anchor of Radyo Patrol Balita Alas Kwatro and the radio commentary program Tambalang Failon at Webb on weekdays with Ted Failon on DZMM. On May 9, 2015, The Philippine Star reported that Webb has resigned from ABS-CBN.

Webb joined CNN Philippines in 2016. The network confirmed her move in a tweet. She debuted with CNN Philippines on April 4, 2016, as the first anchor of its Filipino-language newscast, Balitaan. On September 26, 2016, Webb named as a host for a new current affairs daily program titled The Source.

Television

Radio

Awards and citations
 One of the Best Morning Show Hosts (for Umagang Kay Ganda) - Star Awards for TV (2008, 2009, 2010)
 Best Female Morning Show Host  (for Umagang Kay Ganda) - 1st Media Newser Philippines Awards (2010)
 Best Radio Anchor (for Tambalang Failon at Webb) - 9th Gawad Tanglaw (2011)
 Best TV Anchor (for TV Patrol Weekend) - 11th Gawad Tanglaw (2013)

References

Living people
Filipino television news anchors
Filipino people of American descent
Filipino people of German descent
People from Parañaque
Kapampangan people
De La Salle–College of Saint Benilde alumni
1970 births
CNN people
ABS-CBN News and Current Affairs people
Pinky